An election to Flintshire County Council  took place on 5 May 2022 as part of the 2022 Welsh local elections.

Results

References 

Flintshire County Council elections
2022 Welsh local elections